Villa Purificación is a town and municipality, in Jalisco in central-western Mexico. The municipality covers an area of 1937.61 km².

As of 2005, the municipality had a total population of 10,975.

History and tourism 
In 1532 Nuño Beltrán de Guzmán sent Captain Juan Fernández de Híjar to the province of El Tuito and crowned them to look for a place in order to found a villa. In this virtue, Fernández de Híjar with 25 soldiers marched south and founded on February 2, 1533 the Villa of Purification in the valley of Tecomatlán and also established the first chapel in the now state of Jalisco. Upon the arrival of the Spaniards, Purification belongs to a small province populated by Indians from Saulam, or Sayula, formed by the villages of Tenzitlán, Xirosto, Jew, Pampochin, Amborí, La Silla, Cuxmalán, Carrion and Melahuacan as the headboard. The conquest of this region is due to Francisco Cortés de San Buenaventura, in 1525, remaining within the province.
Tourist and Cultural Attractions:

Historical Monuments

The Parish of the Candelaria.

Feasts 

The Candelaria festival, from January 24 to February 2. The bullfighting party is held for ten days from Easter Sunday.

Music 

Mariachi. Banda Music.

Crafts 

Huaraches, wooden furniture, saddles, and pottery are manufactured.

Gastronomy

Jackals, prawns, birria, pozole, tamales, menudo and mole; sweets made with milk; tequila and raicillla

Touristic centres

You can admire the Parroquia de la Candelaria and the petroglyphs in Chacala; and the natural heritage formed by the forests located in the northern, southern and eastern part of the municipality; the Sierra de la Silleta and the Cacoma Center.

Government

Municipal presidents

References

Municipalities of Jalisco